Jure Verlič (born May 12, 1987) is a Slovenian retired professional goaltender.

Verlič played the majority of his career with HDK Maribor in his native Slovenia, from 2002 to 2005 and again from 2007 to 2012. He moved to Vsetínská hokejová in the Czech Republic in 2005 and played one game in the Czech Extraliga for the team during the 2006–07 season.

Verlič also spent five seasons playing in the FFHG Division 1 in France, playing for Coqs de Courbevoie between 2012 and 2016 and for Remparts de Tours during the 2015–16 season.

His younger brother Miha also played the sport professionally.

References

External links

1987 births
Living people
Sportspeople from Maribor
Slovenian ice hockey goaltenders
HDK Maribor players
VHK Vsetín players
Diables Noirs de Tours players
Slovenian expatriate sportspeople in the Czech Republic
Slovenian expatriate sportspeople in France
Slovenian expatriate ice hockey people
Expatriate ice hockey players in the Czech Republic
Expatriate ice hockey players in France